The Arbëreshë, also known as Albanians of Italy or Italo-Albanians, are an Albanian ethnolinguistic group in Southern Italy, mostly concentrated in scattered villages in the region of Calabria and, to a lesser extent, in the regions of Abruzzo, Apulia, Basilicata, Campania, Molise and Sicily. They are the descendants of Albanian refugees who fled Albania, and later some from Morea between the 14th and the 18th centuries following the Ottoman conquest of the Balkans.

During the Middle Ages, the Arbëreshë settled in the Kingdom of Naples in several waves of migration, following the establishment of the Kingdom of Albania, the death of the Albanian national hero Gjergj Kastrioti Skënderbeu and the gradual conquest of the Byzantine Empire by the Ottomans. 

Their culture is determined by the main features that are found in language, Byzantine Rite Catholic religion, traditional costume, customs, art and gastronomy, still zealously preserved, with the awareness of belonging to a specific sociolinguistic group. Over the centuries, the Arbëreshë have managed to maintain and develop their identities, thanks to their cultural value exercised mainly by the two religious communities of the Byzantine Rite based in Calabria, the Corsini College in 1732, then Sant'Adriano Italo-Albanian College of San Benedetto Ullano in 1794, and the Italo-Albanian Seminary of Palermo in 1735, which was then transferred to Piana degli Albanesi in 1945.

Nowadays, most of the fifty Arbëreshë communities are adherents to the Italo-Albanian Church, an Eastern Catholic Church. They belong to two eparchies, the Lungro, for the Arbëreshë of Continental Italy, the Piana degli Albanesi, for the Arbëreshë of Sicily, and the Monastery of Grottaferrata, whose Basilian monks come largely from the Albanian settlements of Italy. The church is the most important organization for maintaining the characteristic religious, ethnic, linguistic and traditional identity of the Arbëreshë community.

The Arbëreshë speak Arbëresh, a Tosk Albanian variety involving code-mixing with regional Romance languages of Italy. It is of particular interest to students of the modern Albanian language as it retains speech sounds, morphosyntactic and vocabulary elements of the language spoken in pre-Ottoman Albania. In Italy, the Albanian language (and not specifically Arbëresh) is protected by law number 482/99, concerning the protection of the historic linguistic minorities.

The Arbëreshë are scattered throughout southern Italy and Sicily and in small numbers also in other parts of Italy. They are in great numbers in North and South America, especially in the US, Brazil, Chile, Argentina, Mexico, Venezuela, Uruguay and Canada, and in the United Kingdom. It is estimated that there are about 100,000 Italo-Albanians (400,000 if including those outside of Italy); they constitute one of the oldest and largest minorities in Italy. Being Italian and Arbëreshë are both central to Italo-Albanians' identity. When speaking about their "nation", Arbëresh use the term Arbëria, a loose geographical term for the scattered villages in southern Italy which use Arbëresh language. They are proud of their Albanian ethnicity, identity and culture, but also identify themselves as Italian nationals, since they have lived in Italy for hundreds of years.

In the light of historical events, the secular continuity of the Albanian presence in Italy is exceptional. In 2017, with the Republic of Albania, an official application for inclusion of the Arbëresh people has been submitted to the UNESCO as a living human and social immaterial patrimony of humanity.

Distribution 

The Arbëresh villages contains two or three names, an Italian one as well as one or two native Arbëresh names by which villagers know the place. The Arbëreshë communities are divided into numerous ethnic islands corresponding to different areas of southern Italy. However, some places have already lost their original characteristics and the language, and others have totally disappeared. Today, Italy has 50 communities of Arbëreshë origin and culture, 41 municipalities and 9 villages, spread across seven regions of southern Italy, forming a population of about 100,000. Some cultural islands survive in the metropolitan areas of Milan, Chieri, Turin, Rome, Naples, Bari, Cosenza, Crotone and Palermo. In the rest of the world, following the migrations of the twentieth century to countries such as Canada, Chile, Brazil, Argentina, Uruguay and the United States, there are strong communities that keep Arbëreshë traditions alive.

The full list of the Arbëresh Communities in Italy is:

 Abruzzo
 Province of Pescara
 Villa Badessa (frazione of Rosciano): Badhesa
 Molise
 Province of Campobasso
 Campomarino: Këmarini
 Montecilfone: Munxhufuni
 Portocannone: Portkanuni
 Ururi: Rùri
 Campania
 Province of Avellino
 Greci: Katundi
 Apulia
 Province of Foggia
 Casalvecchio di Puglia: Kazallveqi
 Chieuti: Qefti
 Provincia di Taranto
 San Marzano di San Giuseppe: Shën Marcani
 Basilicata
 Province of Potenza
 Barile: Barilli
 Ginestra: Zhura
 Maschito: Mashqiti
 Rionero in Vulture: A-Rionero
 San Costantino Albanese: Shën Kostandini Arbëresh
 San Paolo Albanese: Shën Pali Arbëresh
 Calabria
 Province of Catanzaro
 Andali: Andalli
 Caraffa di Catanzaro: Garafa
 Marcedusa: Marçëdhuza
 Vena di Maida (frazione of Maida): Vina
 Zagarise : Zagari
 Province of Cosenza
 Acquaformosa: Firmoza
 Cantinella (frazione of Corigliano-Rossano): Kantinela
 Cerzeto (in the commune of Cerzeto): Qana
 Castroregio: Kastërnexhi
 Cavallerizzo (frazione of Cerzeto): Kajverici
 Civita: Çifti
 Eianina (frazione of Frascineto): Purçìll
 Falconara Albanese: Fullkunara
 Farneta (frazione of Castroregio): Farneta
 Firmo: Ferma
 Frascineto: Frasnita
 Lungro: Ungra
 Macchia Albanese (frazione of San Demetrio Corone): Maqi
 Malito
 Marri (frazione of San Benedetto Ulolano): Allimarri
Mongrassano: Mungrasana
 Plataci: Pllatëni
 San Basile: Shën Vasili
 San Benedetto Ullano: Shën Benedhiti
 Santa Caterina Albanese: Picilia
 San Cosmo Albanese Strihàri
 San Demetrio Corone: Shën Mitri
 San Giorgio Albanese: Mbuzati
 San Giacomo di Cerzeto (frazione of Cerzeto): Shën Japku
 San Martino di Finita: Shën Mërtiri
 Santa Sofia d'Epiro: Shën Sofia
 Spezzano Albanese: Spixana
 Vaccarizzo Albanese: Vakarici
 Province of Crotone
 Carfizzi: Karfici
 Pallagorio: Puhëriu
 San Nicola dell'Alto Shën Kolli
 Sicily
 Province of Catania
 Biancavilla: Callìcari
 Province of Palermo
 Contessa Entellina: Kuntisa
 Piana degli Albanesi: Hora e Arbëreshëvet
 Santa Cristina Gela: Sëndahstina

Community of Albanian origin 
There are also more than thirty ancient Albanian centers that have lost, in different historical periods and for various reasons, the use of the Albanian language and are thus characterized by a lack of historical and cultural heritage of the Arbëresh: for Emilia-Romagna they are Pievetta and Bosco Tosca, hamlets of Castel San Giovanni (PC); for Lazio it is Pianiano (VT), a hamlet of Cellere; for Molise it is Santa Croce di Magliano (CB); for Campania in the province of Caserta it is Alife; for Puglia they are Casalnuovo Monterotaro, Castelluccio dei Sauri, San Paolo di Civitate (FG), Monteparano, San Giorgio Ionico, San Crispieri, Faggiano, Roccaforzata, Monteiasi, Carosino, Montemesola (TA); for Basilicata they are Brindisi Montagna, Rionero in Vulture (PZ); for Calabria are Cervicati (Çervikat), Mongrassano (Mungrasana), Rota Greca (Rrota), San Lorenzo del Vallo (Sullarënxa '), Serra d'Aiello (Serrë, CS), Amato, Arietta (Arjèta), fraction of Petronà, Gizzeria (Jacaria) and the hamlets Mortilla (Mortilë) and Gizzeria Lido (Zalli i Jacarisë), Zagarise, Zangarona (Xingarona), fraction of Lamezia Terme, (CZ); for Sicily they are Mezzojuso (Munxifsi), Palazzo Adriano (Pallaci, PA), Sant'Angelo Muxaro (Shënt'Ëngjëlli, AG), Biancavilla (Callìcari), Bronte (Brontë), San Michele di Ganzaria (Shën Mikelli, CT).

The communities of Mezzojuso and Palazzo Adriano, in the province of Palermo, are to be considered a particular case, since, despite having lost the Albanian language and the customs of origin, they have kept the Greek-Byzantine rite, a peculiar pillar - together with language and customs - of the Albanian identity of the diaspora. In this case the identity is preserved in the religious aspect and in the historical memory. The communities of Cervicati, Mongrassano and Rota Greca, in the province of Cosenza, preserve the memory of the original cultural heritage.

The Albanian migrations, since the beginning of the long diaspora, led to the formation of medium-small arbëreshe communities well integrated in numerous existing cities of central-northern Italy (in particular, Venice) and in the Crown of Aragon (Naples, Bari, Altamura, Barletta, Andria, Trani, Foggia, Bovino, San Severo, Lecce, Brindisi, Potenza, Matera, Melfi, Caltagirone and Piazza Armerina), in most cases reality - again for different reasons - assimilated by the surrounding culture.

Cultural islands, migrations and the modern Albanian diaspora 
Relevant cultural islands survive in the large metropolitan areas of Milan, Turin, Rome, Naples, Bari, Cosenza, Crotone and Palermo. In the rest of the world, following the migrations of the twentieth century in countries such as Canada, the United States, Argentina, Brazil, Chile and Uruguay there are strong communities that they keep the Arbëreshë language and traditions alive.

Since 1990, with the fall of the post-Bolshevik communist regime in Albania, significant communities of shqiptarë (Albanians of Albania) have entered and integrated into the social fabric of the Italian-Albanian towns. With the struggle for the independence of Kosovo (2008) a very recent group of Albanians, victims of the ethnic cleansing of the Yugoslav regime, has also integrated itself into the various Albanian communities of Italy.

History

Ethnonym 

 
In the Middle Ages, the native Albanians in the area of Albania called their country Arbëri or Arbëni and referred to themselves as Arbëreshë or Arbëneshë. In the sixteenth century, the toponym Shqipëria and the demonym Shqiptarë gradually replaced Arbëria and Arbëresh respectively. Nowadays, only the Albanians in Italy, whose ancestors immigrated from the Middle Ages, are called Arbëresh and the language Arbërisht. The term Arbëreshë and its variants are also used as endonyms by the Arbanasi in Croatia and Arvanites in Greece.

Early migrations 
 

The invasion of the Balkans by the Ottoman Turks in the 15th century forced many Arbëreshë to emigrate from Albania and Epirus , Arika, Thiva, Peloponnesus [Morea]and other Islands  to southern Italy. There were several waves of migrations. In 1448, the King of Naples Alfonso V of Aragon appealed to Skanderbeg to help suppress a revolt at Naples. Skanderbeg sent a force under the leadership of Demetrio Reres, and his two sons. Following a request by the Albanian soldiers, King Alfonso granted them land and they were settled in twelve villages in the mountainous area called Catanzaro in 1448. A year later the sons of Demetrio, George and Basil along with other Albanians were settled in four villages in Sicily.

In 1459, the son of Alfonso, king Ferdinand I of Naples again requested the help of Skanderbeg. This time, the legendary leader himself came to Italy with his troops led by one of his generals, Luca Baffa, to end a French-supported insurrection. Skanderbeg was appointed as the leader of the combined Neapolitan-Albanian army and, after winning two decisive battles, the Albanian soldiers effectively defended Naples. This time they were rewarded with land east of Taranto in Apulia, populating 15 other villages. From the history we know that region of Puglia since 4-5 century Bc was habituated from the Mesapians , Japigins , Dauni e Pekeati. Mesapian language according to the researchers, its same like Albanian language. “bila” means daughter. In region of Vlora daughter is called the same as the Mesapians called it :”Bila”, in the other regions of Albania is called “Bija”. 

After the death of Skanderbeg in 1468, the organized Albanian resistance against the Ottomans came to an end. Like much of the Balkans, Albania became subject to the invading Turks. Many of its people under the rule of Luca Baffa and Marco Becci fled to the neighboring countries and settled in a few villages in Calabria. From the time of Skanderbeg's death until 1480 there were constant migrations of Albanians to the Italian coast. Throughout the 16th century, these migrations continued and other Albanian villages were formed on Italian soil. The new immigrants often took up work as mercenaries hired by Italian armies.

Another wave of emigration, between 1500 and 1534, relates to Arbëreshë from central Greece. Employed as mercenaries by Venice, they had to evacuate the colonies of the Peloponnese with the assistance of the troops of Charles V, as the Turks had invaded that region. Charles V established these troops in southern Italy to reinforce defenses against the threat of Turkish invasion. Established in isolated villages (which enabled them to maintain their culture until the 20th century), Arbëreshë were, traditionally, soldiers for the Kingdom of Naples and the Republic of Venice, from the Wars of Religion to the Napoleonic invasion.

Later migrations 

The wave of migration from southern Italy to the Americas in 1900–1910 and 1920–1940 depopulated approximately half of the Arbëreshë villages, and subjected the population to the risk of cultural disappearance, despite the beginning of a cultural and artistic revival in the 19th century.

Since the end of communism in Albania in 1990, there has been a wave of immigration into Arbëreshë villages by Albanians.

Language 

Arbëresh derives from the Tosk dialect spoken in southern Albania, and is spoken in Southern Italy in the regions of Calabria, Molise, Apulia, Basilicata, Campania, Abruzzi, and Sicily. All dialects of Arbëresh are closely related to each other.

The Arbëresh language retains many archaisms of medieval Albanian from pre-Ottoman Albania in the 15th century. It also retains some Greek language elements, including vocabulary and pronunciation. It has also preserved some conservative features that were lost in mainstream Albanian Tosk. For example, it has preserved certain syllable-initial consonant clusters which have been simplified in Standard Albanian (cf. Arbërisht gluhë  ('language/tongue'), vs. Standard Albanian gjuhë ). It sounds more archaic than Standard Albanian, but is close enough that it is written using the same Albanian alphabet as Standard Albanian. A Shqiptar (Albanian) listening to or reading Arbërisht is similar to a modern English speaker listening to or reading Shakespearean English. The Arbëresh language is of particular interest to students of the modern Albanian language as it represents the sounds, grammar, and vocabulary of pre-Ottoman Albania.

Arbërisht was commonly called  ("Albanian" in Italian) in Italy until the 1990s. Until recently, Arbërisht speakers had only very imprecise notions about how related or unrelated their language was to Albanian. Until the 1980s Arbërisht was exclusively a spoken language, except for its written form used in the Italo-Albanian Church, and Arbëreshë people had no practical affiliation with the Standard Albanian language used in Albania, as they did not use this form in writing or in media. When a large number of immigrants from Albania began to enter Italy in the 1990s, they came into contact with local Arbëreshë communities. 

Since the 1980s, some efforts have been organized to preserve the cultural and linguistic heritage of the language. Arbërisht has been under a slow decline in recent decades, but is currently experiencing a revival in many villages in Italy. Figures such as Giuseppe Schirò Di Maggio have done much work on school books and other language learning tools in the language, producing two books Udha e Mbarë and Udhëtimi, both used in schools in the village of Piana degli Albanesi. 

Linguists focusing on the language include (Albanian) Eda Derhemi, (diaspora born) Martin Di Maggio as well as (Piana degli Albanesi native) Vito Matranga. 

There is no official political, administrative or cultural structure which represents the Arbëresh community. Arbërësh is not one of the group of minority languages that enjoy the special protection of the State under Article 6 of the Italian Constitution. At the regional level, however, Arbërisht is accorded some degree of official recognition in the autonomy statutes of Calabria, Basilicata and Molise. 
 In the case of Calabria, the region is to provide for recognition of the historical culture and artistic heritage of the populations of Arbëresh origin and to promote the teaching of the two languages in the places where they are spoken.
 Article 5 of the autonomy statute of Basilicata lays down that the regional authorities "shall promote renewed appreciation of the originality of the linguistic and cultural heritage of the local communities". 
 Finally, the autonomy statute of the Molise region stipulates that the region "shall be the guardian of the linguistic and historical heritage and of the popular traditions of the ethnic communities existing in its territory and, by agreement with the interested municipalities, shall promote renewed appreciation of them".
 
In certain communes the local authorities support cultural and linguistic activities promoted by the Arbëresh communities and have agreed to the erection of bilingual road signs. There are associations that try to protect the culture, particularly in the Province of Cosenza. The Arbëresh language is used in some private radios and publications. The fundamental laws of the areas of Molise, Basilicata and Calabria make reference to the Arbëresh language and culture. Nevertheless, the increase in training in the use of the written language has given some hope for the continuity of this culture.

Literature

Early Arbëreshë literature 

The first work of Italo-Albanian literature was that of Sicilian archpriest Luca Matranga (1567–1619). The book was titled E mbsuama e krështerë (Christian Doctrine) and it was a simple religious translation in Arbëresh language, aiming at bringing Christianity closer to his people is Southern Italy. While during the 17th century there were no Arbëresh writers, in the 18th century there was Giulio Variboba (1724–1788), regarded by many Albanians as the first genuine poet in all of Albanian literature. Born in San Giorgio Albanese (Mbuzati) and educated in Corsini Seminary in San Benedetto Ullano, after many polemics with local priest he went to exile in Rome in 1761 and there he published in 1762 his long lyric poem Ghiella e Shën Mëriis Virghiër (The life of Virgin Mary). The poem has been written entirely in dialect of San Giorgio and has about 4717 lines. Variboba is considered unique in Albanian literature for his poetic sensitivities and the variety of rhythmic expression. Another known artistic figure of that time was Nicola Chetta (1740–1803) known in Albanian as Nikollë Keta. As a poet he wrote verses both in Albanian and Greek language and he has also composed the first Albanian sonnet in 1777. Being a poet, lexicographer, linguist, historian, theologian and rector of Greek seminary, his variety and universality of work distinguish him from other writers of the period.
The most prominent figure among Arbëresh writers and the foremost figure of the Albanian nationalist movement in 19th-century Italy was that of Girolamo de Rada. Born the son of a parish priest of Italo-Albanian Catholic Church in Macchia Albanese in the mountains of Cosenza, De Rada attended the college of Saint Adrian in San Demetrio Corone. In October 1834, in accordance with his father's wishes, he registered at the Faculty of Law of the University of Naples, but the main focus of his interests remained folklore and literature. It was in Naples in 1836 that De Rada published the first edition of his best-known Albanian-language poem, the "Songs of Milosao", under the Italian title Poesie albanesi del secolo XV. Canti di Milosao, figlio del despota di Scutari (Albanian poetry from the 15th century. Songs of Milosao, son of the despot of Shkodra).  His second work, Canti storici albanesi di Serafina Thopia, moglie del principe Nicola Ducagino, Naples 1839 (Albanian historical songs of Serafina Thopia, wife of prince Nicholas Dukagjini), was seized by the Bourbon authorities because of De Rada's alleged affiliation with conspiratorial groups during the Italian Risorgimento. The work was republished under the title Canti di Serafina Thopia, principessa di Zadrina nel secolo XV, Naples 1843 (Songs of Serafina Thopia, princess of Zadrina in the 15th century) and in later years in a third version as Specchio di umano transito, vita di Serafina Thopia, Principessa di Ducagino, Naples 1897 (Mirror of human transience, life of Serafina Thopia, princess of Dukagjin). His Italian-language historical tragedy I Numidi, Naples 1846 (The Numidians), elaborated half a century later as Sofonisba, dramma storico, Naples 1892 (Sofonisba, historical drama), enjoyed only modest public response. In the revolutionary year 1848, De Rada founded the newspaper L'Albanese d'Italia (The Albanian of Italy) which included articles in Albanian. This bilingual "political, moral and literary journal" with a final circulation of 3,200 copies was the first Albanian-language periodical anywhere.

De Rada was the harbinger and first audible voice of the Romantic movement in Albanian literature, a movement which, inspired by his unfailing energy on behalf of national awakening among Albanians in Italy and in the Balkans, was to evolve into the romantic nationalism characteristic of the Rilindja period in Albania. His journalistic, literary and political activities were instrumental not only in fostering an awareness for the Arbëresh minority in Italy but also in laying the foundations for an Albanian national literature.

The most popular of his literary works is the above-mentioned Canti di Milosao (Songs of Milosao), known in Albanian as Këngët e Milosaos, a long romantic ballad portraying the love of Milosao, a fictitious young nobleman in fifteenth-century Shkodra (Scutari), who has returned home from Thessalonica. Here, at the village fountain, he encounters and falls in love with Rina, the daughter of the shepherd Kollogre. The difference in social standing between the lovers long impedes their union until an earthquake destroys both the city and all semblance of class distinction. After their marriage abroad, a child is born. But the period of marital bliss does not last long. Milosao's son and wife soon die, and he himself, wounded in battle, perishes on a riverbank within sight of Shkodra.

19th-century Romantic poets

Contemporary literature

Protection of language

Religion

The Italo-Albanian Church 
The Italo-Albanian Catholic Church, particular church sui iuris, includes three ecclesiastical jurisdictions: the Eparchy of Lungro degli Italo-Albanesi for the Albanians of Southern Italy based in Lungro (CS); the Eparchy of Piana degli Albanesi for Albanians of Insular Italy based in Piana degli Albanesi (PA); the Territorial Abbacy of Santa Maria of Grottaferrata, with Basilian monks (O.S.B.I.) come from the Italo-Albanian communities, located in the only abbey and abbey church in Grottaferrata (RM).

The Italo-Albanian Catholic Church being a Byzantine enclave in the Latin West, is secularly inclined to ecumenism between the Catholic Church and the Eastern Orthodox Church. It was the only abode of eastern Christianity from the end of the Middle Ages until the twentieth century in Italy.

There are institutions and religious congregations of the Byzantine rite in the territory of the Italo-Albanian Church: the Basilian Order of Grottaferrata, the Collegine Sisters of Sacra Famiglia, Piccole operaie dei Sacri Cuori and the congregation of the Basilian Sisters Daughters of Saint Macrina.

Culture

Traditions and folklore 
Among the Arbëreshë the memory of Skanderbeg and his exploits was maintained and survived through songs, in the form of a Skanderbeg cycle.

Gjitonía 

"Gjitonia" is a form of neighbourhood typical of Arbëresh communities and widespread throughout the Arbëresh people. It comes from the Greek γειτονιά (geitonía). The Gjitonía functions as a microsystem around which the life of the horë (village) revolves; the Gjitonía is a smaller-scale version of the layout of the village often consisting of a small square towards which the alleys are oriented, surrounded by buildings that have openings towards a larger square (shesh) on diagonal angles. The name is usually taken from the families that live there.
The social aspect of the Gjitonía is an ancient and historical structure where values of hospitality and solidarity between the families of the neighbourhood coexisted and where there was no difference of social class. Mainly for the Italian-Albanian communities, it is a world where relationships were so strong that they created real family relationships so much so that the Arbëreshe phrase Gjitoni gjirì ("neighbourhood relatives") is typical.

Costume

Cuisine

 

The Arbëreshë cuisine is composed of the cuisines of Albania and Italy. The style of cooking and the food associated with it have evolved over many centuries from their Albanian origins to a mixed cuisine of Sicilian, Calabrian, and Lucanian influences.

These traditional dishes are Piana degli Albanesi (Palermo, Sicily):

 Strangujët – A form of Gnocchi called Strangujtë made with flour by hand, flavoured with tomato sauce (lënk) and basil. Traditionally this dish was consumed by families seated around a floor level table of wood (zbrilla) on 14 September, the Festa e Kryqit Shejt (Exaltation of the Cross).
 Grurët – Boiled wheat dish flavored with olive oil, known as cuccìa in the Sicilian language. The tradition is to eat it on Festa e Sënda Lluçisë. Variations are the use of sweetened milk or ricotta with flakes of chocolate, orange peel and almonds.
 Kanojët – Cannoli, the universally famous Pianotto sweet pastry. Its culinary secret is waffle (shkorça) of flour, wine, lard and salt and filled with sweetened ricotta, and lastly sprinkled with sieved chocolate.
 Bukë – Arbëresh bread (bukë) is prepared with local hard grain flour and manufactured to a round and mostly leavened shape with natural methods. It is cooked in antique firewood furnaces (Tandoor). It is eaten warm flavored with olive oil (vaj i ullirit) and dusted with cheese or with fresh ricotta.
 Panaret – Arbëresh Easter bread shaped either into a circle or into two large braids and sprinkled with sesame seeds. It is adorned with red Easter eggs. The Easter eggs are dyed deep red to represent the blood of Christ, the eggs also represent new life and springtime. It is traditionally eaten during the Resurrection Meal. After 40 days of fasting, as per the Byzantine Catholic tradition, the Easter feast has to begin slowly, with a light meal after the midnight liturgy on Saturday night. The fast is generally broken with panaret.
 Loshkat and Petullat – Sweetened spherical or crushed shaped fried leavened dough. Eaten on the eve of E Mart e Madh Carnival.
 Të plotit – A sweet cake in various shaped with fig marmalade filling, one of the oldest Arbëresh dishes.
 Milanisë – Traditionally eaten on the Saint Joseph's Day (Festa e Shën Zefit) and Good Friday, is a pasta dish made with a sauce (lënk) of wild fennel paste, sardines and pine nuts.
 Udhose and Gjizë – Homemade cheese and ricotta normally dried outdoors.
 Likëngë – Pork sausages flavored with salt, pepper and seed of Fennel (farë mbrai).
 Llapsana – Forest Brussels sprout (llapsana) fried with garlic and oil.
 Dorëzët – Very thin home-made semolina spaghetti, cooked in milk and eaten on Ascension Day.
 Groshët – Soup made of fava beans, chickpeas and haricot beans.
 Verdhët – During Easter a kind of pie is prepared with eggs, lamb, ricotta, sheep cheese and (previously boiled) leaf stalks of golden thistle; in some villages, the young aerial parts of wild fennel are used instead.

Physical appearance
A study from 1918 included 59 Arbëreshë men from Cosenza, Calabria, the result showed that fair hair was present in 27% of them. The same study also showed that the frequencies of light eyes and white skin, were 47% and 67% respectively. The Arbëreshë, from this survey, are found to be overall less pigmented than the Calabrians. They are also taller (m. 1.64) and less dolichocephalic (cephalic index 80.6).

Genetics 

According to Sarno et al. 2015 there are many Y-DNA haplogroups present among Arbëreshë. Those haplogroups are also shared with their Italian and Balkan neighbours. Arbereshe appear as slightly differentiated from native Southern Italians, and instead overlap with the other Southern Balkan populations of Albania and Kosovo.

Notable Arbëreshë people

Gallery

See also 
 
 Albanians in Italy
 Arvanites
 Culture of Albania
 Illyro-Roman
 Languages of Italy 
 Stradioti

References

External links 
 Arbitalia Shtëpia e Arbëreshëvet të Italisë / The Home of Albanians of Italy
 Jemi.it the Arbëresh web portal managed by the Eparchy of Lungro
 Jeta Arbëreshe Bilingual magazine
 Arberiaguzzardi Maps of the Albanians of Italy
 Mondoarberesco.it Web Jeta Arbresh 
 Museoetnicoarbresh.org Albanian Ethnic Museum of Civita
 Vatrarberesh.it The Albanian Fire
 Arbelmo.it The Italo-Albanian sociocultural blog
 Scesci i Pasionatit.it
 Katundiyne.com Magazine Katundi Yne - Paese Nostro
 E-biblía Digital library on the faith and knowledge of the Italo-Albanian people
 Unibesa.it BESA - Union of Albanian Municipalities of Sicily 
 Unical.it Università della Calabria - Laboratorio di Albanologia
 Treccani.it La comunità albanese d'Italia su Enciclopedia Treccani
 Albanian, Arbëreshë in Ethnologue Languages of the World